Gbadolite or Gbado-Lite (pronounced ) is the capital of Nord-Ubangi Province in the Democratic Republic of the Congo. Gbadolite was the ancestral home and residence of Joseph-Désiré Mobutu, later self-styled as Mobutu Sese Seko where airport, colleges, malls, supermarkets and libraries were built by the President in a program of modernization. Gbadolite is where Mobutu led the summit that would produce the Gbadolite Declaration, a short lived ceasefire in the Angolan Civil War, in 1989.

History
Mobutu built Gbadolite into a luxurious town often nicknamed "Versailles of the Jungle".  He built a hydroelectric dam on the nearby Ubangi River in Mobayi Mbongo, an international airport, Gbadolite Airport, which could accommodate a Concorde, and three large palaces.  As a result, the people of the town had no trouble finding jobs. During Mobutu's regime, Gbadolite also had companies such as CDIA Zaire for farming productions, SOZAGEC for road construction, and SAFRICAS for house construction. The town had a general hospital with high tech facilities, supermarkets or malls, which were destroyed in 1997. Gbadolite had also College Presidentiel, a high school famous for its academic excellence and administered by Jesuit Fathers to whom Mobutu gave the school. This school had a chemistry lab, physics lab, computer lab, Olympic game facilities, and band instruments of all kinds. The town was also famous for its Chapelle Marie la Misericorde, a luxurious church in which Mobutu buried his first wife Mama Mobutu.

Two palaces were built outside Gbadolite at Kawele.  One was an elaborate complex of Chinese pagodas while the other was a modern mansion. Both were used as residences for Mobutu and guests. The three story palace in Gbadolite was used primarily for public functions.

Mobutu also built a nuclear bunker that could house more than 500 people and was the largest in Africa; this was the only nuclear bunker in Central Africa. The bunker was connected to the Ubangui River by a secret tunnel, giving access to the military harbour at the village of N'dangi.

When Laurent Kabila successfully led a rebellion and ousted Mobutu in 1997, Gbadolite was raided, and most of what was in the palaces was looted. The palaces are now being overrun by vegetation.

In 1998, the Ugandan backed MLC (Mouvement de Libération du Congo) rebel group, led by Jean-Pierre Bemba, captured Gbadolite from Kabila's government and it became the MLC's headquarters.

Gallery

See also
 Gbadolite Airport

References

Bibliography

External links

 
Ubangi River